Hihifo Airport  is an airport in Hihifo on Wallis Island in Wallis and Futuna. The airport is 5.6 km from Mata-Utu, the capital city.  It was constructed by Seabees in March 1942 as a bomber field. It was upgraded in 1964.

In 2015 the airport was blockaded by locals as part of a land dispute.

Airlines and destinations

See also

Hihifo District
Pointe Vele Airport
List of airports in Wallis and Futuna

References

External links
 

Airports in Wallis and Futuna